Mian Muhammad Aslam Iqbal is a Pakistani politician who had been the Provincial  Minister  of Punjab for Information and Culture from 19 July 2019 to 2 December 2019. He also had been the Provincial Minister of Punjab for Industries, commerce and investment, in office from 27 August 2018 till 1 April 2022. He had been a member of the Provincial Assembly of the Punjab from November 2002 to November 2007, from June 2013 to May 2018 and from August 2018 to January 2023. He also served as senior minister of Punjab from September 2022 till January 2023.

Early life and education
He was born on 20 April 1969 in Lahore. He holds a Bachelor of Arts degree from Government Islamia College Civil Lines, Lahore. He received the degree of Master of Business Administration (MBA) from Quaid-e-Azam University in 1996.

Political career
He was elected to the Provincial Assembly of the Punjab as an independent candidate from Constituency PP-148 (Lahore-XII) in 2002 Pakistani general election. He received 23,659 votes and defeated a candidate of Muttahida Majlis-e-Amal. He was made Provincial Minister of Punjab for Tourism in January 2003 where he served until 2007.

He ran for the seat of the Provincial Assembly of the Punjab as a candidate of Pakistan Muslim League (Q) from Constituency PP-148 (Lahore-XII) in 2008 Pakistani general election, but was unsuccessful. He received 16,734 votes and lost the seat to a candidate of Pakistan Muslim League (N) Hafiz Mian Muhammad Nauman who scored 40,975 Votes (PML-N).

He was re-elected to the Provincial Assembly of the Punjab as a candidate of Pakistan Tehreek-e-Insaf (PTI) from Constituency PP-148 (Lahore-XII) in 2013 Pakistani general election.

He was re-elected to the Provincial Assembly of the Punjab as a candidate of PTI from Constituency PP-151 (Lahore-VIII) in 2018 Pakistani general election. He received 65,830 votes and defeated Baqir Hussain, a candidate of Pakistan Muslim League (N).

On 27 August 2018, he was inducted into the provincial Punjab cabinet of Chief Minister Sardar Usman Buzdar and was appointed as Provincial Minister of Punjab for industries, commerce and investment.

On 19 July 2019 he was given additional portfolio of Provincial Minister of Punjab for Information and Culture.

In December 2019, He resigned from additional portfolio of Provincial Minister of Punjab for Information and Culture.

In September 2022, he has been appointed as senior minister of Punjab.

References

1969 births
Living people
Politicians from Lahore
Quaid-i-Azam University alumni
Punjab MPAs 2002–2007
Punjab MPAs 2013–2018
Punjab MPAs 2018–2023
Pakistan Tehreek-e-Insaf MPAs (Punjab)
Provincial ministers of Punjab